Mount Valhalla may refer to:

 Mount Valhalla (Antarctica)
 Mount Valhalla (Alaska)